Xiaoxin Yang (born 8 January 1988) is a Chinese-born Monégasque table tennis player who has represented Monaco internationally since 2014.

Singles finals

References

Monegasque table tennis players
Immigrants to Monaco
Chinese female table tennis players
Naturalised table tennis players
Table tennis players from Beijing
Chinese expatriate sportspeople in France
1988 births
Living people
Mediterranean Games medalists in table tennis
Mediterranean Games gold medalists for Monaco
Mediterranean Games silver medalists for Monaco
European Games competitors for Monaco
Table tennis players at the 2019 European Games
Competitors at the 2018 Mediterranean Games
Competitors at the 2022 Mediterranean Games
Table tennis players at the 2020 Summer Olympics
Olympic table tennis players of Monaco